Walhachin Oxbows Provincial Park is a provincial park in British Columbia, Canada.

References

See also
Walhachin, British Columbia

Provincial parks of British Columbia
Thompson Country